Šumuru was one of the eight great clans of Manchu nobility (满清八大姓). After the demise of the dynasty, some of its descendants sinicized their clan name to the Chinese surnames Shu (舒), Xu (徐) or Xiao (蕭).

Notable figures

Males
 Yangguri (1572–1637), military figure and prince
 Tatai (塔台)
Aixinga (d. 1664), Yangguri's grandson; coadjutor in the invasion of Burma
 Tantai, Yangguri's cousin
 Fushan (富善), Aixinga's son, first-class duke
 Haijin (海金), Fushan's son
 Fengsheng'e (丰盛额), a first rank military official (都统) and held the title of first-class Yingcheng duke (一等英诚公)
 Feng'an (丰安), held the title of first-class Yingcheng duke (一等英诚公)
 Folun (d. 1701), served as the Minister of Works from 1686–1687
 Xu Yuanmeng (1655–1741), scholar and politician
 Xu Chengyi (徐诚意), served as an official
 Lunbu (伦布)
Yuzhang (玉彰), served as fifth rank literary official (郎中)

 Prince Consort

Females
Imperial Consort
 Noble Consort
 Noble Consort Tong (1817–1875), the Daoguang Emperor's noble lady, the mother of seventh daughter (1840–1845), Princess Shouxi (1842–1866) and 10th daughter (1844–1845)

Gallery

See also
List of Manchu clans

References
 

Manchu clans

Plain Yellow Banner